Bob Brown (born December 11, 1947) is an American politician who was the Secretary of State for Montana and the Republican nominee for Governor of Montana in 2004.

As a young man, Brown was elected to Montana Legislature. Brown spent four years in the State House (1970–1974) and 23 in the Senate (1975–1997), 
serving as president from 1995-96. His political mentors include Jean Turnage, who spent 20 years in the Senate and subsequently 15 as chief justice of the Supreme Court before retiring in 1991.

Brown became Senate education chairman in 1977 and served in that capacity through 1983. He served as chairman of the taxation committee in 1987. He became chairman of the committee on committees, one of the most innocuously named but powerful Senate committees, in 1989. He sat on the judicial committee from 1975 to 1993.

In 2000, Brown ran for secretary of state and won by a 7 percent margin. In 2004, Brown entered the 2004 Montana gubernatorial election against Democrat Brian Schweitzer. Although the race was heated, he eventually lost.

He served as a fellow at both the Carol O'Connor Center for the Rocky Mountain West and the Maureen & Mike Mansfield Center at the University of Montana. He is currently retired and sits on the board of the Montana State Historical Society. In the 2016 U.S. presidential election, he endorsed Democratic Party nominee Hillary Clinton.

References

External links
 Bob Brown at ballotpedia.org
 Guide to Bob Brown Oral History Project (University of Montana Archives)
 Bob Brown Oral History Project (ScholarWorks: University of Montana)

1947 births
Living people
Republican Party Montana state senators
Politicians from Missoula, Montana
Presidents of the Montana Senate
Secretaries of State of Montana
Candidates in the 2004 United States elections
21st-century American politicians